Sakis Tsiolis (born 30 June 1959) is a Greek professional football manager and former player, who is the current manager of Super League 2 club Iraklis.

Playing career
As a professional footballer, he played for Anagennisi Karditsa, AEL, Ionikos and Paniliakos.
 
Tsiolis, a great player at his prime years, was a Greek Football Cup winner in 1985 and an Alpha Ethniki champion in 1988 with Larissa. He also made four appearances for Greece national football team in 1988, scoring once.

Managerial career
In the 1996–97 season, he was a member of the semi-professional team Asteras Amaliada, as a player-manager.

From 1996 to 2001 he worked as a semi-professional manager for Anagennisi Karditsa (twice), Nafpaktiakos Asteras (twice), Preveza and Panelefsiniakos.
He is a professional manager since 2001, when he started his career at Paniliakos. In the following years he managed Kalamata, Ionikos, Levadiakos, Thrasyvoulos, Olympiakos Volou, Aris Thessaloniki and AE Larissa. On 2 June 2016 he left AEL Larissa because of a disagreement with club president Alexis Kougias over the plans for the next season, after the club was promoted to Superleague Greece

Managerial statistics

References

External links

1959 births
Living people
Association football midfielders
Greek footballers
Greece international footballers
Greek football managers
Super League Greece players
Anagennisi Karditsa F.C. players
Athlitiki Enosi Larissa F.C. players
Paniliakos F.C. players
Ionikos F.C. players
Ionikos F.C. managers
Super League Greece managers
PAS Giannina F.C. managers
Panelefsiniakos F.C. managers
Volos FC managers
Footballers from Karditsa